Joseph Steven Yang (born October 13, 1968) is a South Korean-American actor, writer and producer.

Filmography

External links
 DEFACE cast & crew
 
 Joseph Steven Yang on ReAct Theatre

1968 births
Living people
American male film actors
American male actors of Korean descent